A Christmas Held Captive is an original musical with lyrics and music by Robert J. Sherman and Christopher M. Dawson and book by Lavina Dawson and Michael A. Dawson. The musical officially premiered on December 14, 1986 at the Beverly Hills Playhouse and closed on January 18, 1987. The production was directed by Oliver Muirhead who also played the role of "Constable Scrooge" in the production.  Sets and Costumes were designed by Cora Seiler.  The Music Director was composer Christopher Dawson.  Vocal direction was done by lyricist, Robert Sherman.  Stage Management was done by Lee Doebler.  Lighting and sound were supervised by Robert Duncan.  The show's corporately sponsored by Mrs. Field's Cookies and privately co-sponsored by John Mazur.

History of the Show
Writer Lavina Dawson wrote the script with her older son Michael.  Her younger son, award-winning jazz pianist Christopher was then brought on to write music.  The three Dawsons then approached Christopher's high school friend, Robbie Sherman to pen the lyrics.  Beside co-writing the book and producing the show, Lavina Dawson also played the part of "Mrs. Santa Claus" for select performances during the first run.

Synopsis
It is Christmas Eve and Constable Scrooge has impounded Santa's sleigh. Without the sleigh, Santa Claus can't deliver Christmas presents and the children of the world will be disappointed.  Scrooge admits that he impounded the sleigh, then swallows the key to the impound yard where the sleigh is being kept.  Mrs. Santa explains to Sugar Plum Fairy that she the reason Constable Scrooge had become so bitter was that she had once rejected Constable Scrooge's romantic gestures and married Santa instead.  Now, a love spurned Scrooge has decided to seek revenge upon Santa and Mrs. Claus by ruining Christmas for everyone.  The Little Drummer Boy concocts an elaborate plan to save Christmas, forcing Scrooge to spit up the key.  The Elves, Sugar Plum, Mrs. Santa and the Drummer Boy succeed in getting the key back and Christmas is saved.  A defeated Scrooge confesses that he never gets presents at Christmas.  Santa gives Scrooge a present and his spirits are lifted.

Style
The story roughly follows the structure and style of classic British pantomime.

Songs
Source: "A Christmas Held Captive" Score
 "Overture" – Instrumental
 "It's Christmas Time" – Company 
 "Let's Go A'Christmassing" - Elves
 "I'm Gonna Rock The World (To The Ground)" – Constable Scrooge and Company
 "Bad Santa Rap" – Santa
 "Sugar Plum King" – Sugar Plum
 "Mrs. Santa's Blues" – Mrs. Santa 
 "Good Deed Defenders" – Drummer Boy
 "It's Christmas Time (Finale)" – Company

Note: this is the original song list from the original 1986–87 production.

Characters and original cast

Critical Reception
"Good feelings rollick along with a very listenable score and performances which celebrate Christmas."
"Sherman & Dawson give an indication of the freshness with which they might approach their medium in the future."

Notes

Pantomime
1986 musicals
Fantasy theatre
Original musicals
Christmas musicals
Musicals by Robert J. Sherman